OFK Kosanica is a football club based in Kuršumlija, Serbia. They compete in the Zone League South, the fourth tier of the national league system.

History
After winning the Serbian League East in the 2003–04 season, the club was promoted to the Second League of Serbia and Montenegro. However, they were relegated after only one season, finishing second from the bottom in Group Serbia.

Honours
Serbian League East (Tier 3)
 2003–04
Toplica District League (Tier 5)
 2010–11, 2013–14, 2021–22

References

External links
 Club page at Srbijasport

1928 establishments in Serbia
Association football clubs established in 1928
Football clubs in Serbia